X-DuckX (French: Canards extrêmes) is a French animated television series, lasting for four seasons and 78 episodes, created by Jan Van Rijsselberge, directed by François Reczulski, and produced in 2001 by Alphanim, France 3 and Europool.

The series chronicles the wacky and dangerous adventures of a duo of ducks, Slax and Geextah, extreme sports fans. Both live as their passion, extreme adventures sometimes push them beyond their limits. In France, the series was first broadcast on France 3 in 2002 before being broadcast on Jetix (formerly Fox Kids) from 2004 to 2007. The show also aired on Super RTL in Germany.

Characters
Slax
Slax, unlike his friend Geextah is very awkward. He often told his friend-against whatever the topic between them. The ducks love to innovate in sports and sometimes invent some cars and artillery to be on top of extreme. Slax is a little emotional but very jealous; For example, in one episode, a character named Romumu visits the ducks when Slax wins a TV competition, but he lets his friend aside and plays endlessly with Romumu.
Geextah
Geextah is the little hot head and the head of the duo. He is highly emotional, very suspicious but a little more "clever" than his friend. The only common, he and Slax share, are the passion for extreme sports and feelings for their girlfriend Arielle. He also likes thrash metal music, as well as cheeseburgers. Geextah himself is a "terror"; for example, in an episode in which he stamps a car with his caravan, he explains that "nobody raced Geextah terror."
Arielle
Arielle is the ducks' best and only friend. She is blonde, and, unlike Slax and Geextah, prefers less violent sports; in some episodes, she tries to show that the ducks' sports she practices are better, but without success. Arielle is also a victim of fashion.
J.T. Thrash
Thrash is the ducks' worst enemy. He is blond and pretty well built. Thrash is still competing in extreme sports with Slax and Geextah but they can absolutely not become the sack. He is confident, spiteful and spends all the time getting his revenge against the duo because he is still second on the podium.

Voice cast

French
Philippe Allard - Slax
David Pion - Geextah
Olivier Cuvelier - Additional voices
Nessym Guetat - Additional voices

English
Rick Jones - Slax
Julian Casey - Geextah
Simon Peacock - Additional voices
Helen King - Additional voices
John Stocker - Additional voices

Episodes

References

External links
X-DuckX's official website
X-DuckX on the Internet Movie Database
X-DuckX on the Big Cartoon Database
X-DuckX on Animeka.com

Gaumont Animation
Jetix original programming
2000s French animated television series
2001 French television series debuts
2006 French television series endings
French children's animated comedy television series
Animated sports television series
Animated television series about ducks
Television series created by Jan Van Rijsselberge